Faisalabad Medical University (FMU),  is a public university located in Faisalabad, Punjab, Pakistan, on a  campus on Sargodha Road. It was established in 1973. Teaching hospitals affiliated with the university are Allied Hospital, District Headquarters Hospital and Government General Hospital Ghulam Muhammad Abad Faisalabad. The chief executive is Dr. Zafar Chaudhry, a laparoscopic surgeon. The first group of graduates with M.B.B.S degrees finished in 1978.

With a grant of Rs. 460mn from the government, the construction of new buildings, laboratories and the teaching hospital was completed in 1982. FMU is recognized with the General Medical Council based in London, England, and is listed on World Directory of Medical Schools (it was also listed in the now discontinued International Medical Education Directory). It is also listed among the recognized universities and degree awarding institutions of the Higher Education Commission of Pakistan

Departments

Basic Departments
Anatomy
Physiology
Biochemistry
Behavioral Sciences
Pharmacology
Health Professional Education
Forensic Medicine
Pathology
Community Medicine

Clinical Departments
For the clinical teaching of medical students, classes are held at the affiliated Allied Hospital and DHQ Hospital in Faisalabad.

Chest Disease
Dermatology
Psychiatry
Gynaecology
Ear, Nose and Throat (ENT)
Surgery
Ophthalmology
Gynaecology and Obstetrics
Pediatric Medicine
Orthopedics
Neurosurgery
Cardiology
Urology
Anesthesia
Radiology
Oncology
Nephrology

Hostels,Libraries and Labs
In August 2019, Chief Minister of Punjab (Pakistan) launched the health card scheme and the ceremony was held at the Faisalabad Medical University.

Hostels
Faisalabad Medical University has separate facilities for boy and girl students. The boys hostel is located across the Sargodha Road in Iqbal Hall and Ibn-e-Sina Hall. Each hall has a mess and common room (un-usable), and a common gym. The hostels are one of the best in the Punjab province,vested with facilities not present in any other hostel across Punjab.

There are four halls for girl students. Fatima and Ayesha halls, located adjacent to the Allied Hospital, mainly house the final year students while Liaquat hall accommodates first and second year students and Jinnah Hall the 3rd and 4th year. The hostels close by 9 pm and nobody is allowed in or out of the girls hostels after this time.

Library 
The university has a small library with reading room having capacity of 20 students and one common reading room with capacity of 100 students without internet facility for students. There is a sizable collection of medical books. The reading room remains open till 9PM.

Computer Lab 
A computer lab of 29 Pentium 4 systems has been set up by the University of Health Sciences, with scanners and printers.

College Magazine 
"Parwaz" is the official yearly magazine.

References

External links
Official website 

Medical universities in Punjab, Pakistan
Medical colleges in Punjab, Pakistan
Public universities and colleges in Pakistan
Universities and colleges in Faisalabad District
Faisalabad
1973 establishments in Pakistan
Education in Faisalabad